Jonathan Himebauch is an American football coach and former offensive lineman who is the offensive line coach and co-special teams coordinator for the Arlington Renegades of the XFL. He played college football at USC from 1993 to 1998 and played over parts of five years with various teams in different leagues.

Playing career
He was an offensive lineman and co-captain at the University of Southern California from 1993 to 1998. Professionally, Himebauch was an NFL free agent Offensive Lineman with the Arizona Cardinals (1998), Kansas City Chiefs (1999). He also played for the Rhein Fire of NFL Europe (1999 and 2002) and  Canadian Football League Toronto Argonauts (1999), along with the Los Angeles Xtreme of the XFL in (2001).

Coaching career
Himebauch's first coaching experience as Offensive Line coach at Damien High School in LaVerne, CA (1998) and Palos Verdes Peninsula High School (1999). He then moved to the collegiate ranks as Offensive Graduate Assistant at UNLV (2000–01).  He was the Offensive Line Coach at Santa Barbara City College (2002).

His first professional coaching experience was in the CFL for the Calgary Stampeders in 2003.  He then returned to coach the Offensive Line for former USC and Los Angeles Rams head coach John Robinson at UNLV in 2004. Himebauch then took over as Head Coach for Harvard-Westlake School in North Hollywood, CA in 2005.  Himebauch returned to the collegiate ranks to coach the Offensive Line at San Diego State University in 2006–2008. Himebauch then coached the offensive line for the Montreal Alouettes for head coach Marc Trestman through 2009–2011 where they won back-to-back Grey Cup Championships in 2009–2010. Himebauch went on to coach the offensive line at Wake Forest for Jim Grobe for the 2012–2013 seasons.

In 2014, Himebauch returned to the CFL with the Edmonton Eskimos. In 2015, he was promoted to assistant head coach and offensive line coach with the Toronto Argonauts. He eventually returned to the college ranks as the offensive line coach for Brian Polian at Nevada in 2016 before rejoining Toronto a year later.

In 2019, Himebauch joined Mike Riley's staff with the San Antonio Commanders of the Alliance of American Football as offensive line coach. On May 29, 2019, Himebauch was hired as the offensive line coach for the XFL's Tampa Bay Vipers; the hire reunited him with Trestman who had become the Vipers' head coach.

Himebauch joined the Air Force Academy as the Tight Ends coach in January 2020. 

Himebauch has created his own training business 5asONE LLC that focuses on offensive line skill development, evaluations and recruitment.  He also works with Nike at The Opening camps as lead Offensive Line Coach for elite high school football players across the country.

Homebauch was officially hired by the Arlington Renegades on September 13, 2022

References

External links
 Air Force bio
Toronto Argonauts bio

1975 births
Living people
American players of Canadian football
Calgary Stampeders coaches
Edmonton Elks coaches
Montreal Alouettes coaches
Sportspeople from Greenwich, Connecticut
Toronto Argonauts players
Toronto Argonauts coaches
USC Trojans football players
Los Angeles Xtreme players
Nevada Wolf Pack football coaches
Santa Barbara City Vaqueros football coaches
San Antonio Commanders coaches
Tampa Bay Vipers coaches
Air Force Falcons football coaches
Birmingham Stallions (2022) coaches